The Secretary-General of the National Committee of the Chinese People's Political Consultative Conference (CPPCC) is a political office in the People's Republic of China.

List of officeholders

Notes

See also 

 National Committee of the Chinese People's Political Consultative Conference
 Chairperson
 Vice-Chairpersons
 Standing Committee of the National People's Congress
 Secretary-General

 
1949 establishments in China